Annala is a Finnish and Telugu surname. Notable people with the surname include:

 Valentin Annala (1859–1926), Finnish railway guard, noncommissioned officer and politician
 Vilho Annala (1888–1960), Finnish civil servant, economist and politician
 Marko Annala (born 1972), Finnish heavy metal singer
 Juho Annala (born 1984), Finnish racing driver

Finnish-language surnames
Telugu-language surnames